Clayton is a city in  Montgomery county in the U.S. state of Ohio. The population was 13,310 at the 2020 United States census. A suburb of Dayton. It is part of the Dayton Metropolitan Statistical Area.

The city was named after John Clayton, a War of 1812 veteran.

Geography
Clayton is located at  (39.86066, −84.35508).

In 1998, Clayton annexed the remainder of Montgomery County's Randolph Township.

History
Clayton was platted in 1816 and at that time was known as Salem. It suffered when the National Road bypassed it. In 1906 it became a stop on the Dayton Northern Traction Line. It became a city in 1998 through merger with the rest of Randolph Township, Montgomery County, Ohio.

Demographics

2010 census
As of the census of 2010, there were 13,209 people, 5,118 households, and 3,766 families living in the city. The racial makeup of the city was 76.5% White, 18.8% African American, 0.2% Native American, 1.4% Asian, 0.6% from other races, and 2.5% from two or more races. Hispanic or Latino of any race were 1.4% of the population.

There were 5,118 households, of which 32.1% had children under the age of 18 living with them, 59.2% were married couples living together, 10.7% had a female householder with no husband present, 3.6% had a male householder with no wife present, and 26.4% were non-families. 22.7% of all households were made up of individuals, and 7.8% had someone living alone who was 65 years of age or older. The average household size was 2.56 and the average family size was 3.00.

The median age in the city was 42.6 years. 23.4% of residents were under the age of 18; 7.6% were between the ages of 18 and 24; 22.3% were from 25 to 44; 32.7% were from 45 to 64; and 14% were 65 years of age or older. The gender makeup of the city was 49.0% male and 51.0% female.

2000 census
As of the census of 2000, there were 13,347 people, 4,975 households, and 3,850 families living in the city. The population density was 723.7 people per square mile (279.5/km2). There were 5,193 housing units at an average density of 281.6 per square mile (108.7/km2). The racial makeup of the city was 87.14% White, 9.87% African American, 0.15% Native American, 1.45% Asian, 0.04% Pacific Islander, 0.30% from other races, and 1.03% from two or more races. Hispanic or Latino of any race were 0.90% of the population.

There were 4,975 households, out of which 35.7% had children under the age of 18 living with them, 65.4% were married couples living together, 8.6% had a female householder with no husband present, and 22.6% were non-families. 19.2% of all households were made up of individuals, and 6.5% had someone living alone who was 65 years of age or older. The average household size was 2.66 and the average family size was 3.05.

In the city the population was spread out, with 26.9% under the age of 18, 6.7% from 18 to 24, 27.2% from 25 to 44, 28.0% from 45 to 64, and 11.2% who were 65 years of age or older. The median age was 39 years. For every 100 females, there were 97.9 males. For every 100 females age 18 and over, there were 94.7 males.

The median income for a household in the city was $60,625, and the median income for a family was $67,250. Males had a median income of $45,569 versus $29,261 for females. The per capita income for the city was $26,569. About 3.3% of families and 4.4% of the population were below the poverty line, including 5.9% of those under age 18 and 2.8% of those age 65 or over.

Education
Clayton is served by Montgomery County's Northmont City School District, which operates the following schools:
 Northmont High School
 Northmont Middle School
 Englewood Elementary
 Englewood Hills Elementary
 Northmoor Elementary
 Northwood Elementary
 Union Elementary
 Kleptz Early Learning Center

Notable people
 Jesse "Pop" Haines – member of the Baseball Hall of Fame
 Chris Hero – professional wrestler, ROH tag team champion Ring of Honor
 Johnnie Wilder, Jr. – former lead singer of the funk group Heatwave.

In fiction
Part of Ayn Rand's novel The Fountainhead is set at Clayton. In the early 1930s the novel's male protagonist, the controversial architect Howard Roark, gets a contract to build in Clayton the fictional Janer's Department Store, a five-story building. Later on, Roark's beloved, Dominique Francon, comes to see him there, and feels that in a sense Clayton "belongs to her more than to any of its inhabitants" because her beloved is there.

The book presents Clayton as the archetype of "Middle America", the polar opposite of the cosmopolitan New York City where most of the plot takes place.

References

Cities in Miami County, Ohio
Cities in Montgomery County, Ohio
1816 establishments in Ohio
Populated places established in 1816
Cities in Ohio